Marcella "Chel" Russo (born 4 May 1969) is an Australian actress who is best known for playing Liljana Bishop in the Australian soap opera Neighbours from 2003 until 2005, when her character was killed off in the Neighbours plane crash.

Biography

Russo is a member of the band Lucy De Ville alongside her former Neighbours co-star Marisa Warrington. She had been in several other bands including Swallow and She Is Me.  She has previously appeared as Magenta in The Rocky Horror Show in 2004.

External links
 
Lucy De Ville Official Website
Marcella Russo as Liljana Bishop

Actresses from Melbourne
Australian soap opera actresses
Australian people of Italian descent
Living people
1969 births